Charles Catto (born 1934 in Montreal, Quebec, Canada – March 17, 2006) was director of player personnel of the Cleveland Crusaders ice hockey team during the 1972-73 season and general manager of the St. Louis Blues ice hockey team from May 7, 1973 to May 1974.

References

1934 births
St. Louis Blues executives
2006 deaths